Chapais is a community in the Canadian province of Quebec, located on Route 113 near Chibougamau in the Jamésie region. It is surrounded by, but not a part of, the local municipality of Eeyou Istchee James Bay Regional Government. The community was first settled in 1929, when prospector Léo Springer discovered deposits of copper, silver and gold in the area, and was incorporated as a city in 1955. It was named for Thomas Chapais.

History
Opémisca Copper Mines operated the community's mine until 1991. More recently, with the closure of the mines the community's primary industry has been forestry, and the community opened the first cogeneration plant in Quebec to produce electricity from the sawmill's waste matter.

On the night of January 1, 1980, at 1:30 a.m., 48 people were killed when a fire destroyed the Opémiska Community Hall. Fifty others were injured and rushed to Chibougamau hospital. This fire was the worst to occur in Quebec for more than 40 years. The fire started in wreaths of dried branches and other Christmas decorations, and the ensuing chaos that followed quickly blocked access to the main entrance. Several people managed to escape in time, but the tragedy left deep scars in the community.

Chapais had a population of 1,610 in the Canada 2011 Census.

A crater on Mars is named after this community.

Demographics 

Population:
 Population in 2011: 1610
 2006 to 2011 population change: −1.2%
 Population in 2006: 1630
 Population in 2001: 1795
 Population in 1996: 2030
 Population in 1991: 2391

Mother tongue:
 English as first language: 0.6%
 French as first language: 94%
 English and French as first language: 0%
 Other as first language: 5.4%

Climate
Chapais has a marginal subarctic climate (Koppen: Dfc) just a shade colder than the humid continental (Koppen: Dfb) areas to the south. Winters are bitterly cold, but summers are relatively warm during daytime, but nights remain relatively cool. As such the yearly mean is just above freezing. Summers have high rainfall and winters are quite snowy.

References

External links
 Ville de Chapais

Cities and towns in Quebec
Incorporated places in Nord-du-Québec
James Bay
Jamésie